HMS Argonaut was a  of the British Royal Navy which saw active service during the Second World War. Constructed at the Cammell Laird shipyard, Birkenhead, Argonaut was laid down in 1939, launched in September 1941, and formally commissioned into service on 8August 1942.

She saw service in the Mediterranean in 1942, and was badly damaged on 14 December. After being repaired she took part in Operation Overlord, the Normandy Landings, and Operation Dragoon, the invasion of Southern France, before serving as an escort carrier group flagship.

After the war she was laid up and scrapped in 1955.

History

Mediterranean service
During October and November 1942, Argonaut served as part of Operation Torch, the Allied landings in North Africa. The cruiser formed part of Force H, based in Gibraltar and commanded by Vice Admiral Sir E.N. Syfret. It was charged with guarding the landings against possible attack from Italian or Vichy French naval forces. HMS Argonaut, in particular, was dispatched on a diversionary mission into the Mediterranean.

In December 1942 Argonaut joined the newly formed Force Q, commanded by Rear Admiral Cecil Harcourt, with the mission of disrupting German–Italian convoys on the Tunisian coast.

On 1December, Argonaut and the other ships in Force Q took part in the Battle of Skerki Bank – attacking and largely destroying an Italian convoy. While the Axis forces lost four troop ships and the destroyer  the Allies emerged from the engagement intact. On the following day, the German Air Force sank HMS Quentin westward of Cap Serrat.

Damaged
On 14December 1942, Argonaut was heavily damaged when the  struck the cruiser with two torpedoes from a spread of four, causing serious damage. The bow and stern sections of the cruiser were effectively blown off and the steering wrecked. Though only three crew members were killed, the damage was so severe that German authorities mistakenly believed the Argonaut had been sunk. The ship was patched up and limped to Algiers for more temporary repairs. It then sailed for the United States, where it underwent a seven-month reconstruction, completed in November 1943.

Repairs and later service
When the Argonaut returned to the UK, it was refitted and received the new Type 293and 277radars. It took part in bombardment duties on D-Day under the command of Captain Longley. It also supported the Allied invasion of Southern France, Operation Dragoon, before seeing duty as an escort carrier flagship.

Subsequently, the ship conducted a sweep of the Aegean Sea, sinking a number of small Axis craft, before sailing east to the Indian Ocean, where Argonaut joined the British Pacific Fleet in 1945. After the war, she was laid up on return to the UK in 1946 and saw no further service before being scrapped in 1955.

References

Bibliography

External links

 HMS Argonaut at naval-history.net
 World War II cruisers
 HMS Argonaut at Uboat.net
 http://www.hmsargonaut.co.uk

 

Dido-class cruisers
Ships built on the River Mersey
1941 ships
World War II cruisers of the United Kingdom
Maritime incidents in December 1942